A Priest in 1839 is an unfinished novel by Jules Verne. Written around 1845-1848, it was published in 1992, long after the author's death.

Further reading 
 Christian Robin. Postface et Notes. Le Cherche-Midi Éditeur. 1992. Pages 213-243.
 Isabelle Crépy. Un Prêtre en 1839 (1847) et Le Château des Carpathes (1892), influencés par le roman gothique anglais. Bulletin de la Société Jules Verne 118. Pages 41-43. 2e. trimestre 1996.

References 

1845 French novels
French Gothic novels
Novels by Jules Verne
Novels set in France
Unfinished novels
Novels published posthumously